Armenians in Poland have an important and historical presence going back to the 14th century. According to the Polish census of 2011, there are 3,623 self-identifying Armenians in Poland.

History

Origins
About the beginning of the Armenian presence in Poland, Adolf Nowaczyński, a Polish writer, gives us the following sketch of the Armenians of Poland:

Ties to Lwów

The city of Lwów, (now Lviv), the most patriotic center of Poland, then the theater of so many historic turmoils, owes its luster in large degree to Armenian immigrants. Kamieniec-Podolski (Kamianets-Podilskyi), that crown of Polish old fortresses, received its fame from the Armenians who settled there. Fleeing from Crimea, they were invited to settle in Jazłowiec, where they founded the church of the Holy Mother of God, now dedicated to Saint Nicholas of the Ukrainian Greek Catholic Church. In Bukowina and in all Galicia, the Armenian element plays a role of the first order in political and social life, in industry and in intellectual movement. Finally, in Poland proper and its capital, Warsaw, the descendants of those who once were the great nation on the Arax, rendered themselves illustrious in all careers. In the battles of Grunwald and Varna, the forebears of the Alexandrovics, the Augustinovics, the Agopsovics and Apakanovics took part. Also from their ranks came forth later renowned Poles, such as the Malowski, Missasowicz, Piramowicz, Pernatowicz, Jachowicz, Mrozianowski, Grigorowicz, Barowicz, Teodorowicz, among others.

The growth of Poland's Armenian community

Through successive immigrations, the Armenians of Poland gradually formed a colony, comprising 5,000. They were welcomed by the Kings of Poland and were granted not only religious liberty, but also political privileges. Casimir III (1333–1370) gave to the Armenians of Kamieniec Podolski in 1344 and those of Lwów in 1356 the right of setting up a national council, exclusively Armenian, known as the "Voit." This council, composed of twelve judges, administered Armenian affairs in full independence. All acts and official deliberations were conducted in the Armenian language and in accordance with the laws of that nation. The Armenians of Lwów had built a wooden church in 1183; in 1363 it was replaced by a stone edifice which became the seat of the Armenian prelates of Poland and Moldavia.

In 1516 King Sigismund I authorized the installation in the wealthy and aristocratic center of Lwów an Armenian tribunal called the Ermeni tora in Armeno-Kipchak (Datastan in Armenian). The peaceful life of the colony was troubled in 1626. An abbot named Mikołaj Torosowicz was ordained a bishop in 1626 by Melchisedek, a former coadjutor-Katholikos of Etchmiadzin who supported restoring unity with the Roman Catholic Church. Despite the ensuing rift between the majority of the Armenian community and the few followers of Torosowicz the Armenian community finally reentered into communion with the Holy See forming the Armenian Catholic Church which retained a separate hierarchy and used the Armenian Rite.

Ties to the Armenian community in the Romanian lands

Armenians in Moldavia were under the jurisdiction of the Armenian Diocese of L'viv since 1365, shortly after the principality was founded. As merchants, the Armenians mere present in many of the important commercial centers in the various polities which now make up Romania and Moldova. The oldest architectural monument built by Armenians on these lands and preserved to this day is the church of St. Mary of Botosani, built in 1350. Nicolae Șuțu writes in Notion statistiques sur la Moldavie (published in Iași, 1849): "From the 11th century, the Armenians, leaving their settlements invaded by the Persians, took refuge in Poland and Moldova. Subsequent emigrations took place in 1342 and 1606. The Armenian churches in Moldavia, the oldest of which is in Botoșani and founded in 1350, while the other is in Iași which dates from 1395." The fact that two Armenian Bibles from Caffa dating to 1351 and 1354 were preserved in this church is a testament to the antiquity and importance of the Armenian colony in Botoșani. During the short-lived persecution of the Armenian community under the reign of Moldavian Hospodar Ștefan VI Rareș, many Armenians fled across the border into Poland.  

Around 10,000 of the L'viv Armenian community who had settled in Moldavia moved from there during the Turko-Polish war in 1671 to Bucovina and Transylvania. In Bucovina, they lived in the city of Suceava and its vicinity. In Transylvania they founded two new cities, Erszebetvaros (Elisabethstadt, Dumbrăveni) and Szamos-ujvar (Armenierstadt, Gherla), which, as a special favor, were declared free cities by Charles VI, Emperor of Austria (1711–1740).

When James Louis Sobieski attempted to ascend to the Moldavian throne, his base of operations was the 15th century Armenian monastery of Suceava. Beginning in 1690, the Monastery became the headquarters of the Polish Army for all of their operations in Moldova related to Poland's participation in the War of the Holy League against the Ottoman Empire. Staying at the monastery for several years, the Poles built an extensive network of bastion fortifications which are well preserved to this day.

Intermarriage and assimilation
The Armenian origins of many Polish families can be traced to before World War II, the result of intermarriage. The Armenian cathedral of Lwów, modelled on the Cathedral of Ani, was an important site for religious pilgrimages. The last Armenian Archbishop in Poland, Józef Teodorowicz, as the head of the community, was a member of the Austro-Hungarian Senate, together with Roman Catholic and Greek Catholic colleagues.

Malyi Virmeny which translates to "Little Armenia" in Ukrainian is a historic old town once near the Smotrych River which was founded during the Polish–Lithuanian Commonwealth.

Polish-Armenians in the 20th century 

At the beginning of the 20th century, there were about 6,000 Armenians in Poland living mostly in Eastern Galicia (today Western Ukraine), with centers in Lwów (Lviv), Stanisławów (Ivano-Frankivsk), Brzeżany (Berezhany), Kuty, Łysiec (Lysets), Horodenka, Tłumacz (Tlumach) and Śniatyn (Sniatyn). Polish-Armenians were an integral part of the movement to restore Poland's independence during World War I.

After suffering heavy losses along with the rest of Poland's population in World War II, the Polish Armenian community suffered a second loss. The regions of Poland where Armenians were concentrated such as Eastern Galicia were annexed into the Soviet Union as part of the agreements reached at the Yalta conference. As a result, the Polish Armenian community became dispersed all over Poland. Many of them were resettled in cities in northern and western Poland such as Kraków, Gliwice, Opole, Wrocław, Poznań, Gdańsk, and Warsaw.

To combat this dispersion they began to form Armenian Cultural Associations. Additionally, the Catholic Church opened two Armenian Catholic parishes with one in Gdańsk and the other in Gliwice, while Roman Catholic churches in other cities such as St. Giles in Kraków would from time to time also hold Armenian Rite services for the local Armenian community.

A number of cultural and artifacts of Armenian culture can still be found within Poland's present-day borders, particularly in the vicinity of Zamość and Rzeszów. Additionally, a number of Khachkars have been erected in front of several churches in Wrocław, Kraków, and Elbląg as memorials to commemorate victims of the Armenian genocide. It is unknown whether the Polish-Armenians were specific targets of Nazi Germany during World War II, though the Armenians were not scapegoated by the Nazis unlike Jews, Romani people and other minorities during the Nazi occupation of Poland.

Armenians today 

Most Armenians living in Poland today origins are from the post-Soviet emigration rather than the older Armenian community. After the Soviet Union's collapse, thousands of Armenians came to Poland to look for the opportunity to better their life. It is estimated that between 40,000 and 80,000 Armenians came to Poland in the 1990s, (many of them returned to Armenia or went further West, but up to 10,000 stayed in Poland), with only about 3,000–8,000 from the so-called 'old emigration'.

The Foundation of Culture and Heritage of Polish Armenians was established by the Ordinary of the Armenian-Catholic rite in Poland, Cardinal Józef Glemp, the Primate of Poland, on April 7, 2006 to care for the books, paintings, religious remnants which were saved from perishing when carried away from Armenian churches situated in the Eastern former parts of Poland captured by the Soviets during World War II.

The Armenian Rite Catholic Church which had been historically centered in Galicia as well as in the pre-1939 Polish borderlands in the east, now has three parishes; one in Gdańsk, one in Warsaw and the other in Gliwice.

There are also now schools in Poland that have recently opened or added on courses that teach Armenian language and culture either on a regular or supplementary basis in Warsaw and Kraków.

Notable Poles of Armenian descent 
 Kajetan Abgarowicz (1856–1909) — writer
 Fr. Karol Antoniewicz (1807–1852) — Catholic priest, Jesuit and poet
 Teodor Axentowicz (1853–1938) — painter
 Anna Dymna, (b. 1951), actress
 Zbigniew Herbert (1924–1998) — poet and essayist
 Fr. Tadeusz Isakowicz-Zaleski (b. 1956) — Catholic priest, shepherd of the Armenian Rite faithful in southern Poland, historian, charity worker and independence activist during communist rule
 Jerzy Kawalerowicz (1922–2007) — film director
 Robert Maklowicz (b. 1963) — journalist
 Krzysztof Penderecki (1933–2020) — composer
 Fr. Grzegorz Piramowicz (1753–1801) — Catholic priest, educator and philosopher
 Juliusz Słowacki (1809–1849) — poet
 Szymon Szymonowic (1558–1629) — poet
 Abp. Józef Teodorowicz (1864–1938) — Armenian Catholic Archbishop of Lviv, renowned for his religious and social work.
 Sonia Bohosiewicz (b. 1975) — actress

See also 
 Armenia–Poland relations

References

External links 
 The Foundation of Culture and Heritage of Polish Armenians
 Virtual World of Polish Armenians portal
 Ormiański Kościół Katolicki na dawnych ziemiach polskich 
 Ormiańskie Towarzystwo Kulturalne 

 
Poland
Ethnic groups in Poland
Armenia–Poland relations